Dobbs may refer to

Places
 Dobbs County, North Carolina, USA
Dobbs County Regiment, active in 1775–1783
Fort Dobbs (North Carolina), USA
Fort Dobbs, a 1958 American western
 Dobbs Ferry, New York, USA
Dobbs Ferry station
Dobbs Ferry Union Free School District
 Dobbs Weir, Hertfordshire, England, UK
Dobbs Weir Lock, Hertfordshire, England

Other
 Dobbs (surname)
 Dobbs v. Jackson Women's Health Organization, a US Supreme Court case in which the court found the Constitution did not confer abortion rights
 Lou Dobbs Tonight, an American editorial commentary and discussion program
 Maisie Dobbs (novel), a 2003 mystery by Jacqueline Winspear

See also

 
 Dobb (disambiguation)
 Dob (disambiguation)